Harald Grohs (born 1944) is a race driver and team owner from Essen, Germany.

Grohs took part in more than 50 24 Hours endurance racing races, mainly 24 Hours of Le Mans and 24 Hours Nürburgring.

Career as driver 
1973 first races in a Porsche 911, four wins, invited to race BMW for Team Faltz
1974 German Renault 5 Cup, 6 wins, 2nd in championship
1975 Deutsche Rennsport Meisterschaft (DRM) for BMW for Team Faltz, first wins, but also a bad crash on the Nürburgring, wins 9 Hours of Kyalami with Jody Scheckter
1976 International races for BMW, with Hans-Joachim Stuck, Ronnie Peterson, Gunnar Nilsson, Jody Scheckter, John Fitzpatrick. "Only Stuck and Petersson were a little faster, but partnered with Petersson, we could never finish a race."
1977 National DRM races with an FIA-Group 5-spec BMW 320, against the "BMW-Junior-Teams"
1978 Worst crash of his career, rolling seven times on the Nürburgring Nordschleife, escaping injured, but shocked
1997 retires from Porsche Carrera Cup and other circuit racing, except occasional starts on the old Nürburgring
1999 Another entry in the 24 Hours of Nürburgring, his 50th "marathon" overall

Career as team owner
1997 Grohs Motorsport founded

Racing record

Complete World Sportscar Championship results
(key) (Races in bold indicate pole position) (Races in italics indicate fastest lap)

Footnotes

Complete 24 Hours of Le Mans results

Complete European Formula Two Championship results
(key) (Races in bold indicate pole position; races in italics indicate fastest lap)

Complete Deutsche Tourenwagen Meisterschaft results
(key) (Races in bold indicate pole position) (Races in italics indicate fastest lap)

Complete Super Tourenwagen Cup results
(key) (Races in bold indicate pole position) (Races in italics indicate fastest lap)

References

External links
 https://web.archive.org/web/20051227103043/http://www.grohs-motorsport.de/web/index.html

1944 births
Living people
German racing drivers
24 Hours of Le Mans drivers
24 Hours of Daytona drivers
Racing drivers from North Rhine-Westphalia
Porsche Supercup drivers
World Sportscar Championship drivers
Long Distance Series drivers
Nürburgring 24 Hours drivers
BMW M drivers
Team Joest drivers
Porsche Carrera Cup Germany drivers